Premchand Aggarwal is an Indian politician and member of the Bharatiya Janata Party. Aggarwal is a member of the Uttarakhand Legislative Assembly from the Rishikesh constituency in Dehradun district where he has a residence. He is originally from Doiwala. He has been MLA for Rishikesh consecutively in three terms since the 2007 Assembly election. In the 2017 Assembly election he defeated his nearest rival Rajpal Singh Kharola of Indian National Congress by the margin of 14,801 votes. As of March 2017, he is the current Speaker of the Uttarakhand Legislative Assembly as he was elected unopposed by the newly elected members.

In 2022 Uttarakhand Assembly election, he has defeated nearest rival INC candidate Jayendra Ramola, thus creating history in Uttarakhand. He is continuous winning candidate for last 4 terms from Rishikesh assembly seat, from same party BJP.

References 

People from Rishikesh
Bharatiya Janata Party politicians from Uttarakhand
Uttarakhand MLAs 2022–2027
Living people
Uttarakhand MLAs 2017–2022
Speakers of the Uttarakhand Legislative Assembly
1960 births